Post Mortem is a two-act play written by late–20th–century/early–21st–century playwright A. R. Gurney. It was first produced on stage in New York City in November 2006.

Summary
The story is set in a near-future where, at the start of the play, the United States is ruled by the Christian Right political movement.

In Act One, set in the year 2015, Dexter, a graduate student at a "faith-based" Midwestern university, proposes the subject of his thesis to Alice, his professor — he has discovered a manuscript of an unknown play titled Post Mortem, written by a "minor late–20th/early–21st century playwright", A. R. Gurney.  The content of the play is explosive, and could ignite major change in the country.  Alice is worried about the government finding out via listening devices that may have been installed in her office.  Dexter makes romantic advances on Alice, who rejects him.
Alice reveals youthful dreams of becoming an actress, such hopes having been dashed by the government's conversion of all Broadway theaters to casinos in order to raise money for the enormous sums spent over the years on the continuing war in Iraq.  Alice becomes convinced it is vitally important to stage this play, but is thwarted in her initial proposals to stage the play on-campus by the university administration.  Act I ends with the destruction of the script by the government.

Though the play has no intermission, there is a transition between the acts, when the actress playing Betsy in Act Two comes onstage (in character as a university student, and still within the play's confines, in that she is there to introduce the seminar that is the substance of Act Two).  She gives what is traditionally known in the theater as the "cell-phone speech":  a plea to the audience, usually before the first act begins, to turn off their cell-phones and other electronic devices so that there will be no distractions from the performance.  However, Betsy's boilerplate request, besides being out-of-place, evolves beyond a simple request into a spirited extended monologue on the need for civility in a modern world, a world that not only ignores simple courtesy, but actually seems to encourage rudeness.

In Act Two, set in the year 2027, Dexter and Alice, now married, return to the university as prize-winning celebrities.  They are interviewed by Betsy at a campus seminar about the glorious impact of their nationwide stagings of the now well-known play Post Mortem (which they have re-created from their own memories).  The play has changed society completely, removing the Christian right from positions of political power, and achieving many liberal goals: an effective universal health care system, world peace,
smooth-running public transportation, significant declines in global warming and in the divorce rate.  Dexter flirts with Betsy, to Alice's discomfort.  Both Betsy and Alice wonder what will be the source of morality that had previously been supplied by religion.  And despite all the significant changes wrought by the play, American society still remains entranced by television trivialities.

Productions
 World Premiere (Off-Off-Broadway)
 The Flea Theater, New York, New York
 Opened November 2, 2006
 Closed December 16. 2006
 Cast
 Alice: Tina Benko
 Dexter: Christopher Kromer
 Betsy: Shannon Burkett
 Director: Jim Simpson
 Hudson Valley Premiere
 St. Andrews Church, New Paltz, New York
 Opened April 21, 2007 (one night only)
 Cast
 Alice: Elizabeth Barrows
 Dexter: Jack Kroll
 Betsy: Vivian Lambertson
 Director: Christine Crawfis
 West Coast Premiere
 Lyric Hyperion Theatre Café, Silverlake, California
 Opened January 11, 2008
 Closed February 17, 2008
 Cast
 Alice: Anna Nicholas
 Dexter: Alan Bruce Becker
 Betsy: Andrea Syglowski
 Director: Jered Barclay
 Midwest Premiere
 Black Box Theatre (LeFevre Hall), Ohio State University, Newark, Ohio
 Opened November 13, 2008
 Closed November 22, 2008
 Director: Dave Williams

Critical reception
Most critics enjoyed the first act, but felt that the second act deteriorated into a lecture or a talk-show moment that explained what happened rather than showing the events.
 "The satire is no deeper than a Saturday Night Live sketch but at 80 minutes it wears out its welcome early."
 "There’s a kick or two in that premise, as Gurney good-naturedly pokes fun at himself and peppers the play’s first half with theatre in-jokes, but ultimately the play is only sporadically amusing."
 "On one level, “Post Mortem” isn’t much more than a grab bag of Broadway insider jokes, polemical satire and cosmic lamentation."

Another complaint was the absence of the play-within-the-play.  Though much is made of that play's immense impact, there is no evidence of what that play actually says, proclaims, describes, or portrays that would produce such an effect.

Publication

Post Mortem is published by Broadway Play Publishing Inc.

References

External links
  Off-off-Broadway website

2006 plays
Fiction set in 2015
Fiction set in 2027
Plays by A. R. Gurney
Plays set in the 21st century
Plays set in the United States
Midwestern United States in fiction